Joseph Butler Landrum (December 13, 1928 – August 19, 2018) was an American professional baseball player who played as a pitcher in Major League Baseball. A native of Columbia, South Carolina, he pitched in 16 games during the 1950 and 1952 seasons for the Brooklyn Dodgers.

Landrum's son, Bill Landrum, also pitched in the majors.

References

External links

1928 births
2018 deaths
Major League Baseball pitchers
Brooklyn Dodgers players
Baseball players from Columbia, South Carolina
Clemson Tigers baseball players
All-American college baseball players
Thomasville Dodgers players
Greenville Spinners players
Asheville Tourists players
Fort Worth Cats players
Montreal Royals players